Captain John Davis (born 1784 in Surrey, England) was an English-born American sailor and seal hunter from Connecticut, United States. It is thought that he may have been the first person to set foot on Antarctica, on 7 February 1821, shortly after the first sightings of the new continent, all in 1820, by Fabian Gottlieb von Bellingshausen and Mikhail Lazarev (28 January), Edward Bransfield (30 January), and Nathaniel Palmer (November).

Antarctic claim
Some of Davis' crew from the American sealing ship Cecilia may have landed at Hughes Bay (64°01'S), near the northernmost tip of the Antarctic Peninsula, for less than an hour while looking for seals. The ship's logbook entry reads:

These men made the earliest recorded claim of having set foot on the newly discovered continent of Antarctica.

The first undisputed landing on Antarctica did not occur for another 74 years, on 24 January 1895, when a group of men from the Norwegian ship Antarctic went ashore to collect geological specimens at Cape Adare. The group included the Norwegians Henrik Johan Bull and Carsten Borchgrevink and the New Zealander Alexander von Tunzelmann.

Legacy
The strip of coast on the Antarctic Peninsula where the men are alleged to have gone ashore is now called the Davis Coast.

See also
List of Antarctic expeditions

References

1784 births
American explorers
American hunters
British hunters
English explorers
Explorers of Antarctica
People from Connecticut
People from Surrey
Sealers
Year of death unknown
Davis Coast
British emigrants to the United States